The FIBA 3x3 U23 World Cup is a 3x3 youth international tournament sanctioned by the International Basketball Federation (FIBA) since 2018 for basketball players up to 23 years old. The first edition will be held in Xi'an, China in 2018. FIBA decided to launch the tournament after the hosting of the first edition of the FIBA 3x3 U23 Nations League in 2017 which was deemed a success by the international basketball body.

Results

Men's tournament

Women's tournament

Statistics

Medal table

Participating teams

Men's teams

Women's teams

See also
 FIBA 3x3 World Championships
 FIBA 3x3 Under-18 World Cup

References

External links
 Official website (2018)
 Official website (2019)
 Official website (2022)

Under-23
Under-23
Under-23
World youth sports competitions
Recurring sporting events established in 2018
World championships in basketball
Under-23 sports competitions